Marshall is a town in Saskatchewan, Canada 19 km (12 miles) from Lloydminster on the Yellowhead Highway (Highway 16).

Demographics 

Notable people
It was the home of NHL goaltender Braden Holtby.

See also 

 List of communities in Saskatchewan
 List of towns in Saskatchewan

References 

Wilton No. 472, Saskatchewan
Towns in Saskatchewan
Division No. 17, Saskatchewan